The Franklin Large Igneous Province is a Neoproterozoic large igneous province in the Canadian Arctic of Northern Canada.

See also
Volcanism of Northern Canada

References

External links
February 2015 LIP of the Month: The Franklin Large Igneous Province and Initiation of the Sturtian Snowball Earth Glaciation

Large igneous provinces
Hotspot volcanism
Neoproterozoic volcanism
Proterozoic North America
Volcanism of the Northwest Territories
Volcanism of Nunavut
Geology of Greenland